TRAPPIST-1e, also designated as 2MASS J23062928-0502285 e, is a rocky, close-to-Earth-sized exoplanet orbiting within the habitable zone around the ultracool dwarf star TRAPPIST-1 approximately  away from Earth in the constellation of Aquarius. Astronomers found the exoplanet by using the transit method, in which the dimming effect that a planet causes as it crosses in front of its star is measured.

The exoplanet was one of seven new exoplanets discovered orbiting the star using observations from the Spitzer Space Telescope. Three of the seven (e, f, and g) are in the habitable zone. TRAPPIST-1e is similar to Earth's mass, radius, density, gravity, temperature, and stellar flux. It is also confirmed to not have a cloud-free hydrogen-dominated atmosphere, meaning it is more likely to have a compact atmosphere like the terrestrial planets in the Solar System. 

In November 2018, researchers determined that of the seven exoplanets in the multi-planetary system, TRAPPIST-1e has the best chance of being an Earth-like ocean planet, and the one most worthy of further study regarding habitability. Furthermore, according to the Habitable Exoplanets Catalog, TRAPPIST-1e is one of the most potentially habitable exoplanets discovered.

Physical characteristics

Mass, radius, composition and temperature
TRAPPIST-1e was detected with the transit method, where the planet blocked a small percentage of its host star's light when passing between it and Earth. Transit-timing variations and advanced computer simulations helped constrain the planet's mass, which turned out to be 0.772 , or about 5% less massive than Venus. With both the radius and mass of TRAPPIST-1e determined with low error margins, scientists could accurately calculate the planet's density, surface gravity, and composition. TRAPPIST-1e is unusual in its system as it is the only planet with a pure rock-iron composition, and the only one with a higher density than Earth (TRAPPIST-1c also appears to be entirely rock, but it has a thick atmosphere that makes it less dense than TRAPPIST-1e). It has a density of 5.65 g/cm3, about 1.024 times Earth's density of 5.51 g/cm3. The higher density of TRAPPIST-1e implies an Earth-like composition and a solid rocky surface. This is also unusual among the TRAPPIST-1 planets, as most are completely covered in either a thick steam/hot CO2 atmosphere, a global liquid ocean, or an ice shell. TRAPPIST-1e has 93% the surface gravity of Earth, the second highest in the system. Its radius and mass are also the third least among the TRAPPIST-1 planets.

The planet has a calculated equilibrium temperature of  given an albedo of 0, also known as its "blackbody" temperature. For a more realistic Earth-like albedo however, this provides an unrealistic picture of the surface temperature of the planet. Earth's equilibrium temperature is 255 K; it is Earth's greenhouse gases that raise its surface temperatures to the levels we experience. If TRAPPIST-1e has a thick atmosphere, its surface could be much warmer than its equilibrium temperature.

Host star

The planet orbits an (late M-type) ultracool dwarf star named TRAPPIST-1. The star has a mass of 0.089  – near the boundary between a brown dwarf and low-mass star – and a radius of 0.121 . The star is metal-rich, with a metallicity ([Fe/H]) of 0.04, or 109% the solar amount. This is particularly odd as such low-mass stars near the boundary between brown dwarfs and hydrogen-fusing stars should be expected to have considerably less metal content than the Sun. Its luminosity is 0.0522% of that of the Sun.

The star's apparent magnitude, or how bright it appears from Earth's perspective, is 18.8. Therefore, it is far too dim to be seen with the naked eye.

Orbit
TRAPPIST-1e orbits its host star quite closely. One full revolution around TRAPPIST-1 takes only 6.099 Earth days (~146 hours) to complete. Despite its close proximity to its host star, TRAPPIST-1e gets only about 60% the starlight that Earth gets from the Sun due to the low luminosity of its star. The star would cover an angular diameter of about 2.17 degrees from the surface of the planet, and would appear about four times larger than the Sun does from Earth.

Atmosphere
TRAPPIST-1e is confirmed to not have a cloud-free hydrogen-dominated atmosphere, meaning it is more likely to have a compact, hydrogen-free atmosphere like those of the Solar System's rocky planets, further raising the chances of habitability. Hydrogen is a powerful greenhouse gas, so if there was enough to be easily detected, it would mean that the surface of TRAPPIST-1e would be inhospitable. Since such an atmosphere is not present, it raises the chances for the planet to have a more Earth-like atmosphere instead. However, no atmosphere has been detected, and it is still possible that the planet has no atmosphere at all. Additionally, no helium emission from TRAPPIST-1e was detected .

Habitability

The exoplanet was announced to be orbiting within the habitable zone of its parent star, the region where, with the correct conditions and atmospheric properties, liquid water may exist on the surface of the planet. TRAPPIST-1e has a radius of around 0.91 , so it is likely a rocky planet. Its host star is a red ultracool dwarf, with only about 8% of the mass of the Sun (close to the boundary between brown dwarfs and hydrogen-fusing stars). As a result, stars like TRAPPIST-1 have the potential to remain stable for up to 12 trillion years, which is over 1,000 times longer than the Sun. Because of this ability to live for such a long period of time, it is likely TRAPPIST-1 will be one of the last remaining stars in the Universe, when the gas needed to form new stars will be exhausted, and the existing stars begin to die off.

Other factors and 2018 studies
Despite being likely tidally locked – meaning one hemisphere permanently faces the star while the other does not – which may reduce the habitability of the planet, more detailed studies of TRAPPIST-1e and the other TRAPPIST-1 planets released in 2018 determined that the planet is one of the most Earth-sized worlds found, with 91% the radius, 77% the mass, 102.4% the density (5.65 g/cm3), and 93% the surface gravity. TRAPPIST-1e is confirmed to be a terrestrial planet with a solid, rocky surface. It is cool enough for liquid water to pool on the surface, but not too cold for it to freeze like on TRAPPIST-1f, g, and h. 

The planet receives a stellar flux 60.4% that of Earth, about a third lower than that of Earth but significantly more than that of Mars. Both of these are between those of Earth and Mars as well. In addition, its atmosphere is confirmed to not be dense or thick enough to harm the habitability potential as well, according to models by the University of Washington. The atmosphere, if it is dense enough, may also help to transfer additional heat to the dark side of the planet.

Future observations
As it is one of the most promising potentially habitable exoplanets known, TRAPPIST-1e will be an early target of the James Webb Space Telescope in a research program led by Nikole Lewis. Launched on 25 December 2021, the telescope will allow more extensive analysis of the planet's atmosphere, facilitating the search for any chemical signs of life, or biosignatures.

Discovery 
A team of astronomers headed by Michaël Gillon used the TRAPPIST (Transiting Planets and Planetesimals Small Telescope) telescope at the La Silla Observatory in the Atacama desert, Chile, to observe TRAPPIST-1 and search for orbiting planets. By utilising transit photometry, they discovered three Earth-sized planets orbiting the dwarf star; the innermost two are tidally locked to their host star while the outermost appears to lie either within the system's habitable zone or just outside of it. The team made their observations from September–December 2015 and published its findings in the May 2016 issue of the journal Nature.

The original claim and presumed size of the planet was revised when the full seven-planet system was revealed in 2017:

"We already knew that TRAPPIST-1, a small, faint star some 40 light years away, was special. In May 2016, a team led by Michaël Gillon at Belgium’s University of Liege announced it was closely orbited by three planets that are probably rocky: TRAPPIST-1b, c and d ...
"As the team kept watching shadow after shadow cross the star, three planets no longer seemed like enough to explain the pattern. "At some point we could not make sense of all these transits," Gillon said.
"Now, after using the space-based Spitzer telescope to stare at the system for almost three weeks straight, Gillon and his team have solved the problem: TRAPPIST-1 has four more planets.
"The planets closest to the star, TRAPPIST-1b and c, are unchanged. But there's a new third planet, which has taken the d moniker, and what had looked like d before turned out to be glimpses of e, f, and g. There's a planet h, too, drifting farthest out, and only spotted once."

Gallery

Videos

See also
 List of extrasolar candidates for liquid water
 List of potentially habitable exoplanets
 List of transiting exoplanets

References
 

Exoplanets discovered in 2017
Near-Earth-sized exoplanets
Transiting exoplanets
TRAPPIST-1
Aquarius (constellation)
Near-Earth-sized exoplanets in the habitable zone